Börje Gunnar Carlsson (13 June 1933 – 28 July 2017) was a Swedish Olympic sailor in the Star class. He was born in Stockholm Sweden. He competed in the 1952 Summer Olympics together with Bengt Melin, where they finished 7th.

References

Olympic sailors of Sweden
Swedish male sailors (sport)
Star class sailors
Sailors at the 1952 Summer Olympics – Star
1933 births
2017 deaths
Sportspeople from Stockholm
20th-century Swedish people